In the United States, under current patent law, the term of patent, provided that maintenance fees are paid on time, is 20 years from the filing date of the earliest U.S. or international (PCT) application to which priority is claimed (excluding provisional applications).

The patent term in the United States was changed in 1995 to bring U.S. patent law into conformity with the World Trade Organization's Agreement on Trade-Related Aspects of Intellectual Property Rights (TRIPs) as negotiated in the Uruguay Round. As a side effect, it is no longer possible to maintain submarine patents in the U.S., since the patent term now depends on the priority date, not the issue date.

Design patents have a shorter term than utility patents.  Design patents filed on or after May 13, 2015 have a term of 15 years from issuance. Design patents filed prior to May 13, 2015 have a term of 14 years from issuance.

History
The original patent term under the 1790 Patent Act was decided individually for each patent, but "not exceeding fourteen years". The 1836 Patent Act (5 Stat. 117, 119, 5) provided (in addition to the fourteen-year term) an extension "for the term of seven years from and after the expiration of the first term" in certain circumstances, when the inventor hasn't got "a reasonable remuneration for the time, ingenuity, and expense". In 1861 the seven-year extension was eliminated and the term changed to seventeen years (248).  The signing of the 1994 Uruguay Round Agreements Act then changed the patent term from seventeen years from the date of issue to the current twenty years from the earliest filing date.

Adjustments possible under current law

PTO processing extension
If the United States Patent and Trademark Office fails to examine a patent application in time (deadlines for various steps are different), the patent term may be extended. Extensions or other delay taken by the applicant can reduce or eliminate the extension.

This extension is known as a Patent term adjustment (PTA). Its intention is to accommodate for delays caused by the US patent office during the Prosecution of a US patent application. The total PTA is an addition to the 20-year lifespan of a US patent. The delays are broadly classified into 4 types:

 Type A - this delay is caused when USPTO fails to reply within the time period provided. As per US Patent law USPTO has to issue the First Office action within 14 months of filing of the application. All other office actions has to be issued within 4 months of receipt of an applicant response. Failing to this condition, type A delay will accounted.
 Type B - USPTO estimates the normal prosecution period of an application to be 3 years, i.e. between the date of filing of the application and the issue of the patent. If the prosecution exceeds this time, then Type B delay come into place. Type B delay will calculated if no RCE (Request For Continued Examination) is filed Prior to completion of 3-year period. If the first RCE is filed after 3-year period then type B delay will be calculated up to the date of filing of RCE.
 Type C - This type of delay is calculated in the events of secrecy orders or interferences.
 Applicant Delay - Applicant delay occurs when the applicant fails to respond to the office action within 3 months of mailing of an office action.

Calculation:
Type A delay= Date of issuance of office Action -(Date of receipt of applicant response + 4 Months/14 Months)
Type B delay=Date of issue of Patent/Date of filing of first RCE - (Date of filing of application + 3 years)
Total PTA =Type A+Type B + Type C - Applicant Delay -overlapping delays

Foreign filing priority
The Patent Cooperation Treaty provides a process for a patent filing to claim the priority date of an earlier foreign patent application.  Within one year of filing a patent application in one country, an international patent application (which "designates" certain other countries, by default all contracting states) can be made.  This holds the original priority date and starts the 20-year validity clock, while allowing the actual patent application in the designated countries (and the associated expenses) to be deferred an additional 20 months.  Such a patent would expire earlier than 20 years after U.S. filing.

Reissue and reexamination
Even if the scope of a patent is narrowed, neither reissue nor reexamination changes the original expiration date. A reissued or reexamined patent expires on the day the original granted patent would have ordinarily expired. Example: The validity of a patent (filing: January 1, 2000; issue: January 1, 2002; end: January 1, 2020) is challenged. The USPTO issues a Certificate of Reexamination on January 1, 2004. The reexamined patent is in force until January 1, 2020, assuming payment of all maintenance fees.

Terminal disclaimer 
A terminal disclaimer is a process by which a patent's term is shortened because it duplicates the claims of another patent which expires sooner. If any claim of a pending patent application would have been obvious in light of at least one claim of the applicant's issued patents, the USPTO may reject that claim for obviousness-type double patenting and require the applicant to disclaim a part of the term of the pending application. For example, an applicant's patent A expires on December 24, 2000. The applicant filed another patent application two years later. Under some conditions, the second patent might expire later than the first (based upon the respective earliest claimed priority dates).  If the applicant is required to file, and does file, a terminal disclaimer in the later filed patent, then the later filed patent will expire at the same time as the earlier filed patent, the extra term having been disclaimed ("terminal disclaimer"). In filing the terminal disclaimer, the later filed patent and the earlier filed patent must be, and remain, commonly owned. In the case of co-pending applications, either or both of the applications may have claims rejected for obviousness-type double patenting, and a terminal disclaimer may be required in either or both, in which case the earlier expiration date will control.

After the Uruguay Round Agreements Act of 1994 (URAA), some patents with terminal disclaimers were eligible for a term adjustment because their referenced patents received a term adjustment under the URAA.  Patents whose parents received extensions were eligible to file to receive a similar extension, because the claims they depended on were still protected. This has been discussed in the Manual of Patent Examining Procedure.

A terminal disclaimer does not negate Patent Term Extension that has been granted under 35 U.S.C. 156.
In a pharmaceutical patent dispute, Teva argued that Wyeth’s patent on zaleplon drug products (Sonata) had expired because of a terminal disclaimer. Wyeth (and its exclusive licensee King) argued that patent’s term was ongoing because of a Patent Term Extension due to FDA regulatory review delay. Under 35 U.S.C. 156(a), the term of a patent "shall be extended" after a series of provisions are satisfied. The district court found the language of the statute unambiguous and gives the court "no discretion".

Thus, if the enumerated conditions are satisfied, the patentee is entitled to a term extension calculated pursuant to Section 156. Teva's motion to dismiss was consequently denied because "a terminally disclaimed patent is eligible for extension under [Section] 156." The case is interesting because the patentee in the first instance had expressly disclaimed term subsequent to 2003 to get the patent granted.  However, the holding of this case does not apply to Patent Term Adjustment granted under 35 U.S.C. 154.  Such term adjustments will be subject to any terminal disclaimer that has been filed.

There is now a similar case wherein a company was given extension under S.156 and the generic entrant arguing against such extension between Merck and Hi-tech for the drug dorzolamide (Trusopt).  Here too, the first company (Merck) had filed a standard form terminal disclaimer. This patent was later given an extension and became the crux of the litigation.

FDA approval extension 
The Drug Price Competition and Patent Term Restoration Act (Hatch-Waxman Act) of 1984 provides patent holders on approved patented products with an extended term of protection under the patent to compensate for the delay in obtaining Food and Drug Administration (FDA) approval.

Merck & Co., Inc. v. Hi-Tech Pharmacal Co., Inc. ruled that patents extended under Hatch-Waxman are still eligible to URAA term extension. However, patents in force on June 8, 1995 solely because of the Hatch-Waxman term adjustment are not eligible.

See also
 Supplementary protection certificate

References

Further reading
 For a detailed description of the laws and rules governing patent terms in the U.S., see the Manual of Patent Examining Procedure, Chapter 2700.

External links
  - Contents and term of patent; provisional rights
 2701 Patent Term - 2700 Patent Terms and Extensions in Manual of Patent Examining Procedure (MPEP), USPTO
 USPTO PTA calculation
 Calculating Patent Term Adjustment Post-Novartis
 PTA determination

United States patent law
Time in government